(William Francis) Martin Maddan (4 October 1920 – 22 August 1973) was a British Conservative Party politician.  He was elected as Member of Parliament (MP) for Hitchin in the 1955 general election but was defeated in 1964. He returned for Hove at a 1965 by-election, and served until his death at the age of 52 in 1973.

References

External links 
 

1920 births
1973 deaths
Conservative Party (UK) MPs for English constituencies
UK MPs 1955–1959
UK MPs 1959–1964
UK MPs 1964–1966
UK MPs 1966–1970
UK MPs 1970–1974
Politicians from Brighton and Hove